East Providence School District is the school district of East Providence, Rhode Island.

History
Kathryn Crowley became the superintendent in 2015.

Schools
 High
 East Providence High School
 East Providence Career and Technical Center

 Middle
 Edward R. Martin Middle School
 Riverside Middle School

 Elementary
 Francis School
 Hennessy School
 Kent Heights School
 Orlo Avenue School
 Silver Spring School
 Waddington School
 Whiteknact School

 Pre-Kindergarten and Kindergarten
 James R. D. Oldham School
 Pre-Kindergarten Program

References

External links
 East Providence School District

Education in Providence County, Rhode Island
School districts in Rhode Island